Ogden is a city in Little River County, Arkansas, United States. The population was 180 at the 2010 census, down from 214 at the 2000 census.

Geography
Ogden is located in southeastern Little River County at  (33.586262, -94.045320). U.S. Routes 59 and 71 pass through the city together as a four-lane divided highway, leading northwest  to Ashdown, the county seat, and south  to Texarkana.

Demographics

As of the census of 2000, there were 214 people, 89 households, and 59 families residing in the city.  The population density was 162.0/km (418.8/mi2).  There were 106 housing units at an average density of 80.2/km (207.4/mi2).  The racial makeup of the city was 76.64% Black or African American, 18.69% White, 0.47% Native American, 3.74% from other races, and 0.47% from two or more races.  6.07% of the population were Hispanic or Latino of any race.

There were 89 households, out of which 32.6% had children under the age of 18 living with them, 55.1% were married couples living together, 6.7% had a female householder with no husband present, and 32.6% were non-families. 31.5% of all households were made up of individuals, and 9.0% had someone living alone who was 65 years of age or older.  The average household size was 2.40 and the average family size was 3.03.

In the city, the population was spread out, with 27.6% under the age of 18, 5.1% from 18 to 24, 28.5% from 25 to 44, 24.3% from 45 to 64, and 14.5% who were 65 years of age or older.  The median age was 35 years. For every 100 females, there were 118.4 males.  For every 100 females age 18 and over, there were 115.3 males.

The median income for a household in the city was $26,250, and the median income for a family was $31,250. Males had a median income of $27,500 versus $28,750 for females. The per capita income for the city was $12,118.  About 6.0% of families and 8.0% of the population were below the poverty line, including 3.9% of those under the age of eighteen and 6.7% of those 65 or over.

Notable people

Joe R. Davis, former CEO of Consolidated Graphics
Earnest Rhone, former NFL linebacker for the Miami Dolphins

References

Cities in Little River County, Arkansas
Cities in Arkansas